Matthew Franklin Merritt (March 2, 1815 – May 10, 1896) was a member of the Connecticut Senate representing the 12th District from 1859 to 1860.

Early life
He was born on March 2, 1815, in Flushing, Queens.  He was the son of Nehemiah M. Merritt and Phebe (née Thorne) Merritt. His father was a dry goods merchant on Pearl Street in New York City.

Career
Merritt was a member of the Connecticut Senate from the Connecticut's 12th Senate District.

Personal life
Merritt was married to Mariah Shaw (1820–1901), the daughter of William Shaw and Clarissa (née Hoyt) Shaw. Together, they were the parents of:

 Amelia Merritt (1839–1915), who married William Frederick Skelding (1833–1885).
 Julia Merritt (1841–1908).
 Adeline Gay Merritt (1846–1869).
 Schuyler Merritt (1853–1953), who also served in the Connecticut General Assembly from Stamford and, later, the U.S. House of Representatives.

Merritt died on May 10, 1896, in Stamford, Connecticut. He was buried.

References

1815 births
1896 deaths
Connecticut state senators
People from Flushing, Queens
Politicians from Stamford, Connecticut
Politicians from Queens, New York
19th-century American politicians